Piligenoides is a genus of parasitic flies in the family Tachinidae. There is one described species in Piligenoides, P. vittata.

Distribution
South Africa.

References

Dexiinae
Diptera of Africa
Monotypic Brachycera genera
Tachinidae genera